Bursdon is a village in north west Devon, England. It is located very close to the border with Cornwall.

Villages in Devon